The San Andrea School is a school in Mġarr. It was founded in 1992 at Sedqa, Independence Avenue, Naxxar, by the Parents Foundation of Education (which also founded San Anton School). At the time, it was composed of three classes separated into three buildings: Early School, Middle School and Senior School

Each grade from Pre-nursery to 12th have 4 sections each.

References

Schools in Malta
Educational institutions established in 1992
Mġarr
1992 establishments in Malta